Goodhart's law is an adage often stated as, "When a measure becomes a target, it ceases to be a good measure". It is named after British economist Charles Goodhart, who is credited with expressing the core idea of the adage in a 1975 article on monetary policy in the United Kingdom:

It was used to criticize the British Thatcher government for trying to conduct monetary policy on the basis of targets for broad and narrow money, but the law reflects a much more general phenomenon.

Priority and background
Numerous concepts are related to this idea, at least one of which predates Goodhart's statement. Notably, Campbell's law likely has precedence, as Jeff Rodamar has argued, since various formulations date to 1969. Other academics had similar insights at the time. Jerome Ravetz's 1971 book Scientific Knowledge and Its Social Problems also predates Goodhart, though it does not formulate the same law. He discusses how systems in general can be gamed, focuses on cases where the goals of a task are complex, sophisticated, or subtle. In such cases, the persons possessing the skills to execute the tasks properly seek their own goals to the detriment of the assigned tasks. When the goals are instantiated as metrics, this could be seen as equivalent to Goodhart and Campbell's claim.

Shortly after Goodhart's publication, others suggested closely related ideas, including the Lucas critique (1976). As applied in economics, the law is also implicit in the idea of rational expectations, a theory in economics that states that those who are aware of a system of rewards and punishments will optimize their actions within that system to achieve their desired results. For example, if an employee is rewarded by the number of cars sold each month, they will try to sell more cars, even at a loss.

While it originated in the context of market responses, the law has profound implications for the selection of high-level targets in organizations. Jon Danielsson states the law as 

He suggested a corollary for use in financial risk modelling: 

Mario Biagioli related the concept to consequences of using citation impact measures to estimate the importance of scientific publications:

The law is illustrated in the 2018 book The Tyranny of Metrics by Jerry Z. Muller.

Generalization
Later writers generalized Goodhart's point about monetary policy into a more general adage about measures and targets in accounting and evaluation systems. In a book chapter published in 1996, Keith Hoskin wrote: 

In a 1997 paper responding to the work of Hoskin and others on financial accounting and grades in education, anthropologist Marilyn Strathern expressed Goodhart's Law as "When a measure becomes a target, it ceases to be a good measure," and linked the sentiment to the history of accounting stretching back into Britain in the 1800s:

Examples

See also
 Campbell's law – "The more any quantitative social indicator is used for social decision-making, the more subject it will be to corruption pressures"
 Cobra effect - when incentives designed to solve a problem end up rewarding people for making it worse
 Gaming the system
 Lucas critique – it is naive to try to predict the effects of a change in economic policy entirely on the basis of relationships observed in historical data
 McNamara fallacy – involves making a decision based solely on quantitative observations (or metrics) and ignoring all others
 Overfitting
 Reflexivity (social theory)
 Reification (fallacy)
 Surrogation
 Metric fixation

References

Further reading 

 

1975 in economics
Adages
Economics laws
Economics of regulation
Eponyms